Middlesbrough is a large town, in the north east of England.

Middlesbrough and its variants Middlesborough, Middlesboro and Middlesbro may also refer to:

Places
 Middlesboro, Kentucky, US, former spelling was Middlesborough
 Borough of Middlesbrough, a district of North Yorkshire
 Middlesbrough Rural District, in the North Riding of Yorkshire, England, from 1894 to 1932
 Middlesbrough railway station, serving the town of Middlesbrough, England

Meteorites
 Middlesboro crater, a Permian period meteorite crater in Kentucky, United States
 Middlesbrough meteorite, a meteorite which fell in Middlesbrough, England, in 1881

Sport
 Middlesbrough F.C., an English association football club
 Middlesbrough Futsal Club, an English futsal club
 Middlesbrough Cricket Club, an English cricket club
 Middlesbrough W.F.C., an English association football club
 Middlesbrough RUFC, an English rugby union football club
 Middlesbrough Bears, an English speedway team from 1939 until 1996
 Middlesbrough Ironopolis F.C., an English association football club from 1889 to 1894

United Kingdom Parliament
 Middlesbrough (UK Parliament constituency), a borough constituency in the House of Commons
 Middlesbrough South and East Cleveland (UK Parliament constituency),  a constituency in the House of Commons
 Middlesbrough East (UK Parliament constituency), a former parliamentary constituency
 Middlesbrough West (UK Parliament constituency), a former parliamentary constituency

See also
 Middlesbrough during World War II
 Middleborough, Massachusetts